Born November 20, 1982 

Sabatina James, often referred to as Sabatina, is an Austrian Pakistani humanitarian, author and founder of Sabatina e.V., a non profit organisation based in Germany.  She is known for her human rights advocacy, especially for rescuing persecuted christians in Pakistan and helping muslim girls in Germany to flee from forced marriage and honor killings.

Early life 
Sabatina lived until her tenth year as a Muslim with her family in the city of Dhadar, Pakistan until her family moved to Linz, Austria. Sabatina integrated and assimilated quickly into Austrian society. Her parents were unhappy with this since they understood Austria as a temporary residence. Since restrictions against their daughter were no longer effective, the family decided to send Sabatina to Lahore to marry her cousin. Her parents left her in Pakistan, where she was forced to go to a Madrasa. Sabatina consented initially into the marriage with her cousin in order to get back to Austria. Once in Austria, she refused to marry him. Her family threatened to kill her so she was forced into hiding and take on a new identity. This led to a break-up with the family.

Escape 
She survived by sleeping in a shelter and working at a local café in Linz. Her parents harassed her at both places, showing up and ordering her to wed. Sabatina escaped to Vienna with the help of friends. There she started a new life, changing her name and converting to Catholicism. Sabatina wrote a book about this experience, and her parents sued for defamation. The court ruled in her favor. She was baptized in 2003, in a small Baroque church of a village priest, who was convinced of her inner conversion.

Career 
Since 2006 her organization has fought for victims of honour violence and persecuted Christians in Pakistan.

In 2012 she took part in the international counter-jihad conference in the European Parliament in Brussels, billed as the "International Conference for Free Speech & Human Rights".

In 2014 at the Look! Gala in Vienna, she was honored as "Woman of the year" to spotlight her outstanding achievement for human rights.

Works

References

External links 
 German National Library
 

Austrian former Muslims
Austrian Roman Catholics
Converts to Roman Catholicism from Islam
Former Muslim critics of Islam
Living people
Pakistani former Muslims
Pakistani Roman Catholics
1982 births
Pakistani emigrants to Austria
Naturalised citizens of Austria
Anti-Islam sentiment in Austria
Counter-jihad activists